Bazordan is a commune in the Hautes-Pyrénées department in southwestern France.

Population

Geography
The river Gesse flows northeast through the commune.

See also
Communes of the Hautes-Pyrénées department

References

Communes of Hautes-Pyrénées